Rose Marie Dähncke (born 10 February 1925) is a German mycologist, and popular author of books on foraging and cooking with foraged foods. She is known for studying the mushrooms of La Palma. She has described at least 14 species of fungi, including several in the genera Cystoderma and Lyophyllum.

Scientific works

Popular identification works and cookbooks

References 

1925 births
German women scientists
German mycologists
German food writers
20th-century German botanists
20th-century German women writers
20th-century German non-fiction writers
21st-century German botanists
21st-century German women writers
21st-century German non-fiction writers
Women food writers
German women non-fiction writers
Living people